Alstermo IF Fotboll is a Swedish football team located in Alstermo in Uppvidinge Municipality, Kronoberg County. They are the football department of the sports club Alstermo IF.

Background
Since their foundation Alstermo IF Fotboll has participated mainly in the middle and lower divisions of the Swedish football league system.  The club currently plays in Division 3 Sydöstra Götaland which is the fifth tier of Swedish football. They play their home matches at the Amokabel arena in Alstermo.

Alstermo IF Fotboll are affiliated to Smålands Fotbollförbund.

Recent history
In recent seasons Alstermo IF Fotboll have competed in the following divisions:

2011 – Division III, Sydöstra Götaland
2010 – Division IV, Småland Elit Östra
2009 – Division IV, Småland Sydöstra
2008 – Division V, Småland Östra
2007 – Division V, Småland Östra
2006 – Division V, Småland Östra
2005 – Division VI, Nybro
2004 – Division VI, Nybro
2003 – Division V, Småland Östra
2002 – Division V, Småland Östra
2001 – Division VI, Nybro
2000 – Division VI, Emådalen
1999 – Division V, Småland Östra

Attendances

In recent seasons Alstermo IF Fotboll have had the following average attendances:

Footnotes

External links
 Alstermo IF Fotboll – Website
 Alstermo IF Fotboll on Facebook

Football clubs in Kronoberg County
Association football clubs established in 1927
1927 establishments in Sweden